Pleurodont is a form of tooth implantation common in reptiles of the order Squamata, as well as in at least one temnospondyl. The labial (cheek) side of pleurodont teeth are fused (ankylosed) to the inner surface of the jaw bones which host them. The lingual (tongue) side of pleurodont teeth are not attached to bone, and instead are typically held in place by connective ligaments. This contrasts with thecodont implantation, in which the teeth are set in sockets and surrounded by bone on all sides.

References

External links
 Tooth Implantation at palaeos.com
 Oral Cavity of Reptiles - Anatomy and Physiology

Dentition types
Reptile anatomy